Cecil R. Benjamin is an American political activist and executive, who served as the Chair of the Democratic Party of the Virgin Islands.

Career
Benjamin was previously a teacher and served as the President of the St. Croix Federation of Teachers and the International and National Vice-president of the American Federation of Teachers.

Benjamin has also served as the commissioner of the Virgin Islands Department of Labor.

In 2016, Benjamin served as a super delegate from the U.S. Virgin Islands at the 2016 Democratic National Convention in Philadelphia, Pennsylvania. He supported Hillary Clinton in this position.

Benjamin served as the Chair of the Democratic Party of the Virgin Islands. Benjamin was the U.S. Virgin Island's representative and nominated Joe Biden for the party's nomination. In his video message, Benjamin stated “greetings from the Virgin Islands of the United States, where a young Alexander Hamilton was raised. Vacation home of our nominee, with turquoise waters, white sand beaches and friendly people, we cast our 13 votes for Joseph R. Biden, who will achieve full voting rights in Congress and our right to vote for president.”

References

|-

African-American people
Living people
Temple University alumni
Year of birth missing (living people)